Let's Go was a Canadian children's TV series taped at the CKY-TV studios in Winnipeg, Manitoba, Canada. It premiered September 1, 1976 and ran for 214 episodes through 1987.

The series was developed through the Manitoba Theatre Workshop, some of whose students, including Michael Hearn (as Mikey Simpson)  were featured in the cast.

Each 30-minute episode starred host Janis Dunning (who played Jennifer on The Rockets in 1987–1991) and a rotating cast of five children. Alumni include actor Scott Bairstow, former Shooting Star Theatre, NYC owner Scott Witty, film director Noam Gonick, Aqua Books owner Kelly Hughes, and singer-songwriter Chantal Kreviazuk. Skits were written and performed by Janis and the kids. Songs were pre-recorded at 21st Century Sound in Winnipeg, and later lipsynched by the cast.

The music on the program was written by Victor Davies, who for Let's Go and The Rockets (Janis's next project) wrote more than 600 songs. The theme was co-written and performed by Chad Allan.

This program was broadcast throughout Canada on CTV and ATV.

External links

Let's Go at the Canadian Communications Foundation / History of Canadian Broadcasting

1976 Canadian television series debuts
1987 Canadian television series endings
CTV Television Network original programming
Television shows filmed in Winnipeg
1970s Canadian children's television series
1980s Canadian children's television series